Nika Turković (born 7 June 1995) is a Croatian singer. She got to be known through representing Croatia in the Junior Eurovision Song Contest 2004. Turković was a cast in several music TV shows since and has established herself as a pop singer.

Biography
Turković was born on 7 June 1995 in Zagreb, Croatia. Her mother Gordana, is a dentist, and father Petar, is a psychologist and official of the Croatian nanbudo federation and founder of the first club "Gradec" in Zagreb. 

She lived with her sister Kiara and her maternal grandmother Biserka. She is fluent in English, Spanish, Italian, and Slovene in addition to her native Croatian. Turković was in a 4 year relationship with Croatian singer and fellow cast member of TV show 'A strana' Matija Cvek.

Career
In 2004, Turković was chosen to represent Croatia in the Junior Eurovision Song Contest 2004 held in Lillehammer, Norway. She placed third in the competition. In 2006, she released her debut album, titled Alien. Her live performances include joining Dina Rizvić for some songs in the opening concert of the 2014 Labin Jazz Festival.

Discography

Albums

Singles

References

1995 births
Living people
Musicians from Zagreb
Croatian child singers
Junior Eurovision Song Contest entrants
21st-century Croatian women singers
Turković family